Julius Jia Zhiguo (born 5 June 1934) is an underground bishop of the Roman Catholic Church in the People's Republic of China.

Bishop Jia had been jailed for as long as 20 years, but had been released before he disappeared. During his confinement at home, his requests for medical treatment were denied by Chinese authorities.

In March 2004, the Cardinal Kung Foundation sent out a press release detailing the disappearance of Bishop Jia of Hebei Province in central China. Newspapers picked up the story, and within a week of Mr. Kung's press release, the bishop was freed.

In 2008, he was arrested again by local authorities on the morning of August 24, the twelfth such arrest since January 2004.

In 2009, Chinese police re-arrested Bishop Jia Zhiguo of Zhengding, the most prominent leader of the Chinese "underground Church." The arrest came just as a special Vatican commission met in Rome to consider the situation facing the Church in China.

Zhiguo was once again arrested by authorities in 2020.

See also 
Chinese house church

References

1934 births
Living people
21st-century Roman Catholic bishops in China